Bimenjgan (also Romanized as Bīmenjgān and Bīmanjegan; also known as Bīd-e Manjegān, Qal‘eh-i-Bemingon, and Qal‘eh-ye Bemīn Gūn) is a village in Dehdasht-e Gharbi Rural District, in the Central District of Kohgiluyeh County, Kohgiluyeh and Boyer-Ahmad Province, Iran. At the 2006 census, its population was 454, in 93 families.

References 

Populated places in Kohgiluyeh County